Jabhat Ansar al-Islam (Supporters of Islam Front), originally formed as Tajamu' Ansar al-Islam (Assembly of the Supporters of Islam) in August 2012, is an independent Sunni Islamist Syrian rebel group active in the Quneitra and Daraa Governorates.

Jabhat Ansar al-Islam is among dozens of Syrian rebel groups that have in the past been supplied with US-made BGM-71 TOW anti-tank missiles and Soviet-made 9K32 Strela-2 MANPADS with US approval.

Ideology
Abu al-Majd al-Jolani, commander of Jabhat Ansar al-Islam, stated during an interview on 14 July 2014 that he wanted to establish an Islamic state based on Sharia, and opposed both democracy and a caliphate similar to one proclaimed by the Islamic State of Iraq and the Levant.

History
The group was originally formed as Tajamu Ansar al-Islam, or the Gathering of Supporters of Islam, a coalition of several Sunni Islamist groups in Damascus and the Rif Dimashq Governorate, announced on 8 August 2012. The coalition initially consisted of the Habib al-Mustafa Brigade, the Companions Battalions, Brigade of Islam, Criterion Brigade, Hamza ibn Abdul-Muttalib Battalion, Shield of al-Sham Battalions, and the Damascus branch of the Descendants of the Prophet Brigade. The group took part in the rebel capture of the Marj al-Sultan heliport on 25 November 2012 and the Battle of Daraya, part of the Rif Dimashq offensive (November 2012–February 2013).

In late 2013, Tajamu Ansar al-Islam fell apart due to differences and disputes between its component groups.

On 31 March 2014, Jabhat Ansar al-Islam was formed in the Damascus and Quneitra countryside by the Usama ibn Zayd Brigade, Izz ibn 'Abd al-Salam Brigade, and the Battalion of the Chargers. Some time after its formation, the group established a branch in southern Damascus.

On 21 February 2015, the group announced the creation of a branch in the Idlib Governorate in northwestern Syria.

On 6 April 2017, clashes erupted between Jabhat Ansar al-Islam and the Syrian Revolutionaries Front in the northern Quneitra countryside, which resulted in 7 rebels being killed. Government forces shelled the area on the same day, which resulted in a ceasefire between the two rebel groups.

On 30 May 2018, two commanders of Jabhat Ansar al-Islam, Abu al-Majd al-Jolani and Bashar Abu Shihab, were captured by groups affiliated with the Free Syrian Army in the Quneitra countryside while attempting to surrender to the Syrian Army carrying around $300,000.

See also
List of armed groups in the Syrian Civil War

References

External links

 Jabhat Ansar al-Islam YouTube Channel (terminated)

Anti-government factions of the Syrian civil war
Syrian opposition
Sunni Islamist groups